Nikolai Aleksandrovich Samoylov (born 3 January 1980) is a Russian former professional footballer.

Club career
He made his debut in the Russian Premier League in 2000 for FC Rotor Volgograd.

References

1980 births
Living people
Russian footballers
Russia under-21 international footballers
Association football defenders
FC Rotor Volgograd players
FC Sibir Novosibirsk players
FC Ural Yekaterinburg players
Russian Premier League players
FC Volgar Astrakhan players
FC Sodovik Sterlitamak players
FC Mordovia Saransk players